The International Journal for Multiscale Computational Engineering is a bimonthly scientific journal of  engineering published by Begell House. It covers modeling, simulation, and design of products based on multiscale principles aimed at reducing prototyping costs and time to market. The editor-in-chief is Jacob Fish. According to the Journal Citation Reports, the journal's 2009 impact factor is 0.734, ranking it 39th out of 79 journals in the category "Engineering, Multidisciplinary" and 54th out of 80 in the category "Mathematics, Interdisciplinary Applications".

External links
 

Engineering journals
Bimonthly journals
English-language journals
Begell House academic journals